Maybin is a surname, and may refer to:

Aaron Maybin (born 1988), American football defensive end
Cameron Maybin (born 1987), American Major League Baseball player
Edith Maybin (born 1969), Canadian photographer
Gareth Maybin (born 1980), Northern Irish professional golfer